Duke Wu of Qi (died 825 BC) was from 850 to 825 BC the eighth recorded ruler of the State of Qi during the Western Zhou Dynasty of ancient China.  His personal name was Lü Shou (呂壽), ancestral name Jiang (姜), and Duke Wu was his posthumous title.

Duke Wu succeeded his father Duke Xian of Qi, who died in 851 BC, as ruler of Qi.  He reigned for 26 years and died in 825 BC.  He was succeeded by his son, Duke Li of Qi.

Family
Sons:
 Prince Wuji (d. 816 BC), ruled as Duke Li of Qi from 824–816 BC

Daughters:
 Queen Xian of Zhou, known as Queen Jiang
 Married King Xuan of Zhou (d. 782 BC) in 826 BC, and had issue (King You of Zhou)

Ancestry

References

Monarchs of Qi (state)
9th-century BC Chinese monarchs
825 BC deaths
Year of birth unknown